Bohdan Beniuk (born 26 May 1957) is a Ukrainian actor of theater and cinema, politician, People's Artist of Ukraine (1996). Along with Anatoliy Khostikoiev, he is a creator of the Theatrical company Beniuk and Khostikoiev.

Biography
Beniuk was born on May 26, 1957 in town of Bytkiv, Nadvirna Raion, Ukrainian SSR. He has two brothers: People's Artist of Ukraine Petro Beniuk and Vasyl Beniuk. Bohdan Beniuk graduated the National University of Theatre, Film and TV in Kyiv in 1978.

In 1978-80 he worked in the Kyiv theater of young viewer. After that, Beniuk was an actor of the Franko National Academic Drama Theater in Kyiv.

Since February 2018, Professor Bohdan Beniuk has been the head of the Department of Acting and Drama Directing at the Karpenko-Kary National University of Kyiv. On November 8, 2022, he was temporarily appointed artistic director of the Kyiv Academic Drama Theater in Podil for the period of martial law.

Selected filmography
 The Lady with the parrot (Дама с попугаем, 1988)  as Director of the pioneer camp

Politics
During the Ukrainian parliamentary elections Beniuk was on the 2nd place on the election list of Svoboda. March 18, 2014 Benyuk, along with his teammates on the "Svoboda" party, including the deputy of the Verkhovna Rada Ihor Miroshnychenko, by the use of physical force pushed the head of the National Television Company of Ukraine Oleksander Panteleimon to resign. Benyuk outrage was triggered by demonstration on TV news the celebration in Russia over the return of the Crimea. Actions of members of the party "Svoboda" were condemned by both the public in Ukraine, and by the Prime Minister of Ukraine Arseniy Yatsenyuk.

In the 2019 Ukrainian parliamentary election Benyuk is placed sixth on the joined list of Svoboda with National Corps, the Governmental Initiative of Yarosh and Right Sector.

Recognition
 Merited Artist of Ukrainian SSR (1988)
 People's Artist of Ukraine (1996)
 Laureate of the Dovzhenko State Prize (1998)
 Laureate of the Shevchenko National Prize (2008)

External links
 Profile at the Franko National Academic Drama Theater
 Unofficial website
 Official website
 Beniuk and Khostikoiev

References

1957 births
Living people
People from Ivano-Frankivsk Oblast
Recipients of the title of People's Artists of Ukraine
Recipients of the Shevchenko National Prize
Kyiv National I. K. Karpenko-Kary Theatre, Cinema and Television University alumni
Ukrainian male stage actors
Seventh convocation members of the Verkhovna Rada
Svoboda (political party) politicians
Ukrainian male film actors
20th-century Ukrainian male actors
21st-century Ukrainian male actors
Laureates of the Oleksandr Dovzhenko State Prize